Haapakoski is a Finnish surname. Notable people with the surname include:

 Aarne Haapakoski (1904-1961), Finnish pulp writer
 Antti Haapakoski (born 1971), Finnish hurdler
 Mikko Haapakoski (born 1967), Finnish ice hockey defender
 Niko Haapakoski (born 1996), Finnish volleyball player
 Paula Haapakoski (born 1977), Finnish orienteering competitor
 Tapani Haapakoski (born 1953), Finnish Olympic pole vaulter

Finnish-language surnames